John Yule was a Scottish-born American politician who served in the California State Assembly as a Republican from the 20th district between 1861 and 1886. Between 1865 and 1866, Yule served as Speaker of the Assembly. He was reelected to the Assembly from the 20th district in 1885. He was also affiliated with the National Union Party during the Civil War.

In April 1888 a dead body, which was thought to be Yule's, was found near Mud Springs, California (now known as El Dorado). The body was stripped naked and had a bullet hole in its forehead. Local newspapers later reported that they had determined that the body did not belong to Yule. Yule's fate is still unknown.

Yule Marble, which was used to construct the Lincoln Memorial and the Tomb of the Unknown Soldier, is named after John's brother George, a Colorado prospector.

References 

1833 births

Year of death uncertain
Date of death missing
Speakers of the California State Assembly